Friedrich-Paul von Groszheim (born April 27, 1906 in Lübeck; died January 6, 2006 in Hamburg) was a German man who was imprisoned by the Nazis for the crime of homosexuality under Germany's now-repealed Paragraph 175. He was born in Lübeck, Germany.

Life
Friedrich von Groszheim came from an upper-class Lübeck family. His father died in 1917 during the First World War, as did his mother some time later, so that he and his sister were raised by two aunts.

Von Groszheim trained as a wholesale merchant and was already regularly active in the gay scene in his hometown in the 1920s.

Imprisonment
In January 1937 Von Groszheim was one of 230 men arrested in Lübeck on suspicion of homosexuality by the SS and was imprisoned for around ten months on the basis of Section 175, during which he had to wear a badge emblazoned with a capital A, for Arschficker ("arse-fucker"):They beat us to a pulp. I couldn't lie down...my whole back was bloody.

He was arrested again in 1938 and was humiliated, tortured and was given the alternative to either be castrated or deported to Sachsenhausen concentration camp. He agreed to the castration. In 1940 he was decommissioned due to his lack of fitness and declared unfit for military service.

In 1943 he was imprisoned again, this time in a satellite camp of Neuengamme concentration camp, for having been a monarchist and supporter of Kaiser Wilhelm II.

After the war and the collapse of the Third Reich, he moved to Hamburg, where he worked as a hotel clerk until his retirement.

He took part in several documentaries and spoke for the first time about 45 years after the end of the war about his homosexuality and the suffering in prison.

His time in prison and in the Neuengamme concentration camp were not recognized by the Federal Republic of Germany during his lifetime.

With his death in 2006, it was assumed that the last homosexual concentration camp survivor in Germany had died until Rudolf Brazda was found, who died around five years later.

Since August 19, 2021, a stumbling block has commemorated Friedrich Paul von Groszheim in front of his house at Kaiserallee 11 in Lübeck-Travemünde.

After the war
Von Groszheim settled in Hamburg, Germany. In 1995, he was one of eight signers to a declaration given to the US Holocaust Memorial Museum in Washington, D.C. that called for the "memorializing and documenting of Nazi atrocities against homosexuals and others."

See also
Karl Gorath
Persecution of homosexuals in Nazi Germany and the Holocaust

References

External links
One Person's Story

1906 births
2000s deaths
Date of death unknown
Place of death unknown
German monarchists
German prisoners and detainees
German torture victims
Homosexual concentration camp survivors
German gay men
Neuengamme concentration camp survivors
People convicted under Germany's Paragraph 175
People from Lübeck
20th-century German LGBT people